Omar Hayat Mahal, also spelt Umer Hayat Mahal, and alternatively known as Gulzar Manzil,  is an early 20th-century wooden haveli mansion in Chiniot, Pakistan. 

The mansion was started in 1923, and was completed by 1935. The mansion, originally 5-storeys tall, was built by Sheikh Omar Hayat - a Chinioti businessman who had made his fortune in Calcutta. The edifice displays outstanding examples of Chiniot's local woodworking style, and has been described as an "ornament" of a building on account of its lavishly decorated interior.

History 
Sheikh Omar migrated from Chiniot to Calcutta in the late 19th century after being ostracised for marrying against his family's will. Large numbers of Chiniot's Sheikh tribe had settled in Calcutta during the British era.

Sheikh Omar's first son, Gulzar, was born in 1920, prompting Sheikh Omar's decision to return to his hometown, where he decided to construct a magnificent palace that would feature the best of Chiniot's craftsmanship.

Syed Hassan Shah was assigned the task of palace's construction. He gathered Chiniot's best artisans, as well as from different places, who continued working day and night for 10 ten years. Rahim Bakhsh Pirjha and Elahi Bakhsh Pirjha, masters in the manabat kari  style of wood carving, carried out much of the mansion's woodworking. Ahmad Din, completed the brickwork, while the celebrated artist Niaz Ahmad Jalandari did the stucco-work. Another celebrated artist, Jan Muhammad, painted the mansion's frescoes.

The mansion was habitable by 1930, and described as a 'local wonder' by the British authors of the District Gazeteer of Jhang. It was completed in 1935 - at a cost of 200,000 rupees. Sheikh Omar died shortly after its completion in 1935.

Sheikh Omar Hayat's only son, Gulzar, was married in the mansion in an extravagant ceremony in 1937. Gulzar was found dead in the palace the very next day of his marriage, possibly as a result of inhalation poisoning as a result of large volumes of coal that had been burnt for the celebration. He was buried in the courtyard of the ground floor of the palace, alongside the grave of his mother, who later passed.

Mr Hayat's relatives abandoned the mansion, associating it with bad luck. Servants continued living for a couple of years, though no family members laid claim to the building. In 1940, the Anjuman-e-Islamia organisation opened a school in the building. An orphanage was established in 1948 Sheikh Muhammad Amin, though it was shifted in 1950, leaving the building abandoned once again. Local scavengers dismantled some of the mansion's decorative elements, and sold them to collectors in other cities.

Two levels of the mansion was removed in the 1970s due to its state of dangerous disrepair, while another level had to be abandoned following severe rains in 1993. The building was brought under government control in 1989, with large portions repaired by the mid-1990s with funds raised by the local community. The mansion is now used a cultural centre and library.

Architecture 

The palace's building is perhaps the last of Mughal's architectural style, or a Mughal Revival building ("revival" buildings are interpretations of an old architectural style by people of a later era). Unique  carving cuts on the doors, windows and jhirokas reflect a colour of their own.
The roofs, balconies, stairways, terrace and the stucco designs make a perfect interior. The facade of the building is decorated with a fine inlay of bricks, the dazzling shine of marble and picturesque shades help it rank among the great palaces of Mughal era landlords.

Conservation 
Later on this placed was occupied by Qabza mafia who destroyed most of the building However seeing death of its glory  in 1989, M. Athar Tahir, the then deputy commissioner of Jhang, took note of the mansion's poor state. He removed the encroachments, and brought the building under government ownership. Muhammad Amjad Saqib, Chiniot's assistant commissioner, lead a fundraising effort to raise money for the mansion's repair, and started its restoration with an expenditure of Rs1,700,000.

On 7 June 1990, it was decided that the Gulzar Manzil be acquired for the people, be conserved and restored. By the mid 1990s, large portions of the mansion had been repaired or restored, although the quality of some restoration works was poor.

Upon completion, it was decided that the mansion would be accorded a more dynamic role in the life of Chiniot, and thus a massive fund-raising drive was initiated for its conversion into a library and cultural centre. With the help of philanthropists and municipal authorities, the conversion efforts commenced on 14 August 1990. A rare collection of thousands of books and subscription for seven dailies was introduced to learners and It was publicly opened the then Punjab Governor, Mian Muhammad Azhar.

Keeping the vision and wishes of its owner in view, the library in the Gulzar Manzil was named after Sheikh Omar Hayat. In 1997 the municipal committee refused to bear the expenses and terminated the subscription of newspapers and other reading materials. At present the palace is again in disrepair, though the facade and interiors are well-maintained. The upper-most floors remain in a state of disrepair, however.

References

Houses completed in 1935
Mughal architecture
Palaces in Pakistan
Chiniot District
Libraries in Pakistan